Juventud, a Spanish word meaning youth, or Juventude, its Portuguese equivalent, may refer to:

Places
Isla de la Juventud, Cuba

People
Juventud Guerrera, ring name of Mexican professional wrestler Eduardo Aníbal González Hernández also known as "Juvi"

Arts and entertainment

Juventud
Arriba Juventud, Argentine musical
Canción de Juventud (Song of Youth), Spanish 1962 musical directed by Luis Lucia
DKDA: Sueños de juventud, (English: DKDA: Youth dreams), Mexican juvenile telenovela 
El Grito de la juventud, Argentine film directed by Brazilian director Raul Roulien
Fiebre de juventud (English: "Youth Fever"), also known as Romance en Ecuador (English: "Romance in Ecuador"), 1966 Mexican-Ecuadorian musical comedy
Idolos de Juventud, Spanish soap opera telenovela produced by the United States-based television network Telemundo
Juventud (TV series), soap opera and Mexican telenovela produced for Televisa in 1980
Juventud En Extasis, a 2007 album by Maria Daniela y su Sonido Lasser
Loca juventud, 1965 Spanish and Italian film directed by Manuel Mur Oti
Mágica juventud (English title: Magic youth), Mexican telenovela 
Premios Juventud or Youth Awards, is an awards show for Spanish-speaking celebrities in the areas of film, music, sports, fashion, and pop culture, presented by the television network Univision

Juventude
Juventude de Atitude (Attitude Of Youth), the second album of Brazilian hip hop group Facção Central

Media and publications
El Nuevo Tesoro de la Juventud, Spanish encyclopaedia
Juventud Comunista (newspaper), or Communist Youth, was a weekly newspaper published from Barcelona, Spain 1936-1937
Juventud Rebelde, Cuban newspaper

Politics

Juventud
Juventud Aprista Peruana, Peruvian youth organisation
Juventud del Poder Popular, Colombian political group
Juventud Uruguaya de Pie, a former Uruguayan far-right youth organisation

Juventude
Aliança Socialista da Juventude (ASJ) or Socialist Youth Alliance, earlier Portuguese leftist youth movement linked to the Workers Revolutionary Party (PRT)
Grupo Tacuara de la Juventud Nacionalista or Tacuara Nationalist Movement, established 1955 and  through the 1960s, Argentine Neo Nazi movement later integrated Juan Perón's right-wing "Special Formations"
Juventud Aprista Peruana, youth organization of Partido Aprista Peruano in Peru
Juventude CDU, the youth wing of the Unitarian Democratic Coalition (CDU) in Portugal consisting of the Portuguese Communist Youth (JCP) and Ecolojovem 
Juventude Comunista Portuguesa (JCP) or Portuguese Communist Youth, youth organization of the Portuguese Communist Party
Juventud Comunista Revolucionaria youth wing of the Revolutionary Communist Party of Argentina
Juventudes de Izquierda Comunista or Communist Left Youth, an earlier Spanish youth organization
Juventude do MPLA (JMPLA) or Youth of MPLA, a major mass organization within the People's Movement for the Liberation of Angola
Juventud Parroquial Chilena (JUPACH), Chilean Catholic youth organization
Juventud del Poder Popular, was the Colombian youth organization of the Colombian political movement Poder Popular during the 1980s
Juventude Popular or People's Youth (Portugal), Portuguese political youth organisation
Juventude Social Democrata, the youth wing of the Portuguese Social Democratic Party, liberal-conservative political party in Portugal
Juventud Uruguaya de Pie or The Uruguayan Youth Standing, was a Uruguayan far-right student organization during the 1970s
Nova Juventude de Macau or New Youth of Macau, a political party in the Chinese Special Administrative Region of Macau

Juventudes
Juventudes de Acción Popular (JAP), the youth wing of CEDA, a Spanish Catholic right-wing party in the 1930s
Juventudes Comunistas de Chile (JJ.CC. / La Jota) or Communist Youth of Chile, youth wing of the Communist Party of Chile
Unión de Juventudes Maoístas (UJM) or Maoist Youth Union, was a youth organization in Spain during the transition to democracy

Sports

Football clubs

Juventud
Atlético Juventud Girardot, El Salvador
Club Atlético Juventud, Argentina
Club Atlético Juventud Unida Universitario, Argentina
Club Joventut Badalona, Spain
C.D. Juventud Candelareño, El Salvador
C.D. Juventud Independiente, El Salvador
C.D. Juventud Olímpica Metalio, El Salvador
FC Isla de La Juventud, Cuba
Juventud Alianza de San Juan, Argentina
Juventud Antoniana, Argentina
Juventud Cambados, Spain
Juventud La Joya, Peru
Juventud de Pergamino, officially Club Atlético Juventud, Argentina 
Juventud de Las Piedras, Uruguay
Juventud Ticlacayán, Peru
Juventud de Torremolinos CF, Spain
Juventud Retalteca (now defunct), Guatemala
Juventud La Rural, Peru
Juventud Unida de Gualeguaychú, Argentina
Juventud Unida de San Miguel, Argentina
Juventud Unida Universitario, Argentine
C.D. Real Juventud, Honduras
Real Juventud San Joaquín, Chile
SV Juventud Tanki Leendert, Aruba
Unión Juventud, Peru

Juventude
Esporte Clube Juventude, Brazilian football team; Juventude most commonly refers to this team in football terms
Juventude Sport Clube, also commonly known as Juventude de Évora, amateur sports club based in Évora, Portugal
Juventude (Fogo), Cape Verdean football team
Juventude Ouriense, Rink Hockey team from Ourém, Portugal
Juventude (Sal), Cape Verdean football team
Juventude Atlético do Moxico, Angolan football team
Juventude Atlética de Rio Meão, Portuguese football club in the parish of Rio Meão, municipality of Santa Maria da Feira, the district of Aveiro
Sociedade Esportiva e Recreativa Juventude, smaller Brazilian football team from Mato Grosso state
Sociedade Esportiva Juventude, smaller Brazilian football tean from São Mateus do Maranhão, Maranhão state

Other sport clubs
Associação Juventude de Viana, Portuguese rink hockey club from Viana do Castelo, Portugal
G.D. Juventude de Viana (roller hockey), formerly Enama de Viana, Angolan sports club based in the municipality of Viana, Luanda
Isla de la Juventud (baseball), Cuban baseball team
Juventud Alianza, Argentine sports club based in the city of Santa Lucía, San Juan
Juventud de Las Piedras or Club Atlético Juventud, sports club from Las Piedras, Canelones, Uruguay
Juventud Sionista, Argentine basketball club

Other
Instituto de la Juventud, or Institute of Youth, an agency of the Government of Spain responsible for promoting youth associations
Isla De La Juventud tree hutia, or southern hutia (Mysateles meridionalis), species of rodent in the family Capromyidae